Kosovar or Kosovan may refer to:
 Something of, from, or related to the Republic of Kosovo
 A citizen of Kosovo, see Demographics of Kosovo
 An ethnic Albanian from Kosovo
 Kosovar Chess Championship, founded in 1990
 Kosovar culture, culture of Kosovo
 Kosovar cuisine, cuisine of Kosovo
 Kosovar passport

See also 
 List of Kosovars
 
 

Language and nationality disambiguation pages